Nikolai  Nikolayevich Kutler (Russian: Николай Николаевич Кутлер; 23 July 1859 – 10 May 1924) was a Russian politician.

Biography 
Assistant minister of the Interior, 1904–1905. Assistant minister of Finance, manager of Nobles Land Bank and Peasant Land Bank,  1905. Minister of Agriculture, 1905. Kutler resigned from his position when he was criticized for his project of compulsory alienation of private estates in February 1906 and joined Constitutional Democratic Party. He was elected member of 2nd and 3rd State Dumas and became one of its leading authorities on the agrarian question, replacing Mikhail Herzenstein, who was murdered by Black Hundreds.

After the Bolshevik revolution Kutler worked at the People's Commissariat of Finance and was State Bank of the USSR board member.

References

 Out of My Past: The Memoirs of Count Kokovtsov Edited by H.H. Fisher and translated by Laura Matveev; Stanford University Press, 1935.

1859 births
1924 deaths
People from Tula, Russia
People from Tula Governorate
Russian Constitutional Democratic Party members
Government ministers of Russia
Members of the State Council (Russian Empire)
Members of the 2nd State Duma of the Russian Empire
Members of the 3rd State Duma of the Russian Empire
Russian Constituent Assembly members